Sir Percival Victor David Ezekiel David, 2nd Baronet (21 July 1892 – 9 October 1964) was a Bombay-born British financier who is best known as a scholar and collector of Chinese ceramics. He also formed a collection of Chinese stamps and postal history that has been evaluated as one of the greatest ever assembled.

Early life
David was born in Bombay into a Jewish family in British India that originated in Baghdad. His father, Sir Sassoon David, 1st Baronet, founded the Bank of India.

He was educated in India at Elphinstone College and the University of Bombay, and then at the University of London (D. Lit.).

Personal life
David married in 1912, and Sheila Yorke Hardy was his second wife

He married in 1920, in London, and inherited his father's baronetcy in 1926.

He funded the excavation of the southern tomb in Seobongchong(서봉총) and visited there in 1929. Seobongchong are 2 old tombs of Silla kingdom at Gyeongju, South Korea. But the excavation was processed by Japanese scholars because Korea was Japanese colony in 1920s. So, they named the tomb 'David chong'(David-tomb), but present Korean scholars call it 'Seobongchong nambun'(서봉총 남분, southern tomb in Seobongchong).

Career
David was a financier and the chairman of Sassoon, J. David and Co Ltd., in Bombay.

Chinese ceramics
After his marriage in 1920, David began to collect Chinese art, and to study the Chinese language. He first visited China in 1923, and became fascinated by Chinese ceramics, devoting most of the rest of his life to their study and collection. He joined the Oriental Ceramic Society in 1930 and then sponsored exhibitions in London. He translated the Ge Gu Yao Lun, a fourteenth century Ming period manual by Cao Zhao. This was published as Chinese Connoisseurship: The Ko Ku Yao Lun, The Essential Criteria of Antiquities. (Faber & Faber, 1971).

The Percival David Foundation of Chinese Art is his collection of Chinese ceramics and related items in London.  The Foundation's main purpose is to promote the study and teaching of Chinese art and culture.  The Collection consists of some 1,700 pieces of Song, Yuan, Ming and Qing ceramics, mostly porcelain, from the 10th century to the 18th, "high-quality Chinese-taste Song, Ming and Qing ceramics", as the British Museum puts it.  It concentrates on the ceramics made for the imperial court, and includes examples of the rare Ru and Guan wares and two important Yuan dynasty blue and white porcelain temple vases (the "David Vases") the oldest dated blue and white porcelain objects, from 1351 A.D.

It also holds a large library of Western and East Asian books related to Chinese art.  In 1950 the collection was presented to the University of London and until 2007 was displayed in a house in Gordon Square.  Since 2009 it has been shown in a separate gallery, Room 95, at the British Museum, where it is on long-term loan.  Percival had already donated several pieces to the British Museum.

Philately
David built a collection of Chinese stamps and postal history that is thought to be one of the greatest ever created. The collection, which included material that David acquired from John A. Agnew (died 1939), was sold by Robson Lowe between 1964 and 1975, with many items entering the collection of the Japanese philatelist Meiso Mizuhara. David joined the Royal Philatelic Society London in 1939 and subsequently became a fellow of that society. Some of his China essays and proofs were displayed in New York in 1947.

Honours and arms
He was an officer of the Legion d'Honneur; F.S.A., F.R.A.I., F.R.S.A., Hon Advisor 1928–29 National Palace Museums (Beijing); Governor of School of Oriental and African Studies (SOAS), University of London; Director of the International Exhibition of Chinese Art, 1935-6.

Death and legacy
David died on 9 October 1964 after which the baronetcy became extinct.

Sir Percival and Lady David are commemorated at SOAS in the Percival David Foundation on Torrington Square and the Lady David Gallery on Gordon Square.

References

External links

1892 births
1964 deaths
Chinese porcelain
People associated with the British Museum
Sassoon family
British art collectors
British Jews
Baronets in the Baronetage of the United Kingdom
Philately of China
British philatelists
Fellows of the Royal Philatelic Society London
British sinologists
Alumni of the University of London
University of Mumbai alumni
Chinese art collectors
Historians of East Asian art
Indian people of Iraqi-Jewish descent
British India emigrants to the United Kingdom
British people of Iraqi-Jewish descent
People from Mumbai